Nikolai Viktorovich Starikov (born 23 August 1970, Leningrad) is a Russian writer, opinion journalist and social activist. Founder and former leader of Great Fatherland Party and its subsidiary social NGO, Union of Russian Citizens.

Starikov is the organizer of the "Goebbels' Award", which is awarded to "people who lie about, slander and vilify Russia", following the results of a vote among readers of his websites: nstarikov.ru and nstarikov.lj.ru.

Biography 

Nikolai Starikov was born on 23 August 1970 in the city of Leningrad. He is married and has two daughters. In 1992 he graduated from the Saint Petersburg State University of Engineering and Economics, with a degree in economics. He frequently appears as an expert in economics in documentaries, for example in "Parvus of the Revolution", "Storm of the Winter Palace. Refutation."

Starikov about conspirology:

Political activity 

Starikov is the leader of several political organizations, including the Union of Russian Citizens, founded on 25 April 2011, and the conservative Great Fatherland Party, registered on 10 April 2013. He has championed a revisionist view of Joseph Stalin, portraying him as an effective leader and bulwark against western expansion.

In 2020, he became a member of the For Truth political party.

On 4 October 2022 Starikov in his Twitter wrote: "I urge once and for all to destroy the entire infrastructure of Nazi Ukraine. By doing this, we will save the lives of our soldiers and the lives of millions of people who are just becoming citizens of our country"

Books 

 "Who Killed the Russian Empire? Mystery of 20th Century.", Moscow, Yauza, Eksmo, 2006. (in Russian)
 "Myths and Truth about Civil War. Who Finished Off Russia?", Moscow, Yauza, Eksmo, 2006. (in Russian)
 "Betrayed Russia. Our 'Allies' from Godunov to Nicholas II.", Moscow, Yauza, Eksmo, 2007. (in Russian)
 "1917: Not A Revolution But Special Operation!", Yauza, Eksmo, 2007 (in Russian)
 "Who is financing Russia's collapse? From Decembrists to Mujahideen.", St. Petersburg, Piter, 2008. (in Russian)
 "Who Forced Hitler to Attack Stalin?", St. Petersburg, Piter, 2008. (in Russian)
 "Who Set Hitler Against Stalin? Hitler's Terrible Blunder", Piter, 2015 (English translation of the above book)
 "Seek the Oil. Why is Our Stabilizing Fund Placed There?", St. Petersburg, Piter, 2008. (in Russian)
 "Crisi$: How is It Organized", St. Petersburg, Piter, 2009. (in Russian)
 "Salvation of US Dollar - War", St. Petersburg, Piter, 2009. (in Russian)
 "Rouble Nationalization: The Way to Russia's Freedom", St. Petersburg, Piter, 2011. (in Russian/English).
 "Crisis: How is it done? (+ audio CD, read the author)", St. Petersburg, Piter, 2011. (in Russian).
 "Chaos and Revolution - Weapons Of US Dollar.", St. Petersburg, Piter, 2011. (in Russian).
 "Ukraine - Chaos and Revolution - Weapons Of US Dollar.", St. Petersburg, Piter, 2014. (in Russian).

References

External links 
 Official blog of Nikolai Starikov (in Russian)
 Blog of Nikolai Starikov (English mirror)
 

1970 births
Living people
Writers from Saint Petersburg
Conservatism in Russia